Karbówka  is a village in the administrative district of Gmina Lubomino, within Lidzbark County, Warmian-Masurian Voivodeship, in northern Poland.

Before 1772 the area was part of Kingdom of Poland, and then from 1772–1945, Prussia and Germany (East Prussia).

References

Villages in Lidzbark County